Peperomia williamsii is a species of an Epiphyte Peperomia Plant. It is endemic to Bolivia. It is named after Robert S. Williams.

References

williamsii
Flora of South America
Flora of Bolivia
Plants described in 1901
Taxa named by Casimir de Candolle